LDC may refer to:

 Lady Doak College, in India
 Lambert Dodard Chancereul, the largest poultry meat group in Europe
 Law Development Centre, a Ugandan law school
 Least Developed Countries
 Less developed country, or developing country
 Leonardo DiCaprio 
 Linguistic Data Consortium
 Lloyds Development Capital, a private equity house
 LLVM D Compiler, a D programming language compiler
 Local distribution company
 Locally decodable code, an error correction code
 Load duration curve, in electric power generation
 London Dumping Convention
 Louis Dreyfus Company, a global merchant firm.
 Louisiana Department of Corrections, now Louisiana Department of Public Safety & Corrections
 Lysine decarboxylase